John Beale may refer to:
 John Beale (footballer) (1930–1995), English footballer
 John Beale (writer) (c. 1608–1683), English clergyman, scientific writer and Fellow of the Royal Society
 John Elmes Beale (1847–1928), English politician and merchant
 Alan John Beale (1923–2005), commonly known as John Beale, British medical scientist
 John C. Beale (born 1948), American EPA fraudster

See also

Jack Beale (1917–2006), Australian politician
John Beal (disambiguation)
John Beall (disambiguation)